Maa Tujhhe Salaam may refer to
"Maa Tujhhe Salaam" (song), a patriotic album song from A.R.Rahman's 1997 album Vande Mataram
Maa Tujhhe Salaam (2002 film), a Bollywood film starring Sunny Deol and directed by Tinnu Verma
Maa Tujhe Salaam (2018 film), a Bhojpuri film